Darrell Lee Woodard (born December 10, 1956) is a former American professional baseball player. He played part of one season in Major League Baseball for the Oakland Athletics during the 1978 season. A second baseman for most of his professional career, he was primarily used by Oakland as a pinch runner, appearing in that capacity in 22 of his 33 games played.

References

Major League Baseball second basemen
Oakland Athletics players
Birmingham Barons players
Boise A's players
Jersey City A's players
Lewiston Broncs players
Macon Peaches players
Miami Amigos players
Midland Cubs players
Modesto A's players
Wichita Aeros players
Baseball players from Arkansas
1956 births
Living people
African-American baseball players